Selskap med begrenset ansvar, with short form BA, is a Norwegian term for a corporation comparable to a limited liability company. Meaning literally Company with limited liability, it is a type of corporate structure used in Norway for limited companies based on a co-operative structure.

Legal framework
Unlike the aksjeselskap (AS), a regular stock-based limited company, the BA is structured either as a Særlovsselskap, a company founded under a particular act of legislature or as a cooperative.
In the latter case, the limitations and legal framework is set out in the [Limited Liability Companies Act] of 1997 ss 1-1(3).3, a Norwegian Act of Parliament relating to limited liability companies covering: "companies formed in order to promote the members' consumer or professional interests or companies formed to secure employment for the members"

Difference from an AS company
The most notable difference between a regular limited company (AS) and a BA is that while the distribution of profits in an AS in general follows the ownership (N% of the shares receive N% of the distributed profits), the distribution of profits in a BA must in general follow the members shares of the revenues of the company. Typically someone representing N% of the revenues of a BA company will receive N% of the profits (standard consumer co-operative distribution of profits). The Legislation Department of the Norwegian Ministry of Justice and the Police have indicated that a minor percentage of profits distributed based upon ownership may still be accepted.

Usage
The most prominent uses of BA companies are in local Coop retail cooperatives and the agriculture cooperatives. Formerly a number of state enterprises were BA companies, including the Norwegian State Railways, the Postal Service and Postbanken. All of these have been converted to AS's.

Types of companies of Norway